The Hope Collection of Pictures, also known as The Hope Collection of Pictures of the Dutch and Flemish Schools, was a distinguished group of eighty-three paintings that were sold together in 1898 by Lord Francis Pelham Clinton-Hope. It included works by more than thirty different artists, a number of them being individuals whose names are renowned within the art world.

History

Multiple members of the branch of the Hope family which became established in Amsterdam pursued an interest in acquiring fine paintings. By the later part of the 18th century they owned a large number of works, and 372 of their paintings accompanied Henry Hope when he moved from the Dutch Republic to London in 1794. An inventory with insured values of the paintings at his home in England was compiled not long afterwards on 17 December 1795. He would continue to purchase works, and upon his death a cumulative total of at least 378 paintings that had been in his possession were sold through three Christie’s auctions that were held in April 1811, June 1816,  and July 1816.

This particular collection was a subset of a group of paintings that came to be owned by Henry Thomas Hope following the deaths of his father Thomas Hope and his uncle Henry Philip Hope. Henry Thomas Hope was one of a handful of individuals who were initially contacted regarding making a loan to the 1857 Manchester Art Treasures exhibition, and twelve of his paintings would be sent to Manchester. Following his death in 1862, the collection was inherited by his widow, Anne Adèle Hope. In 1891 the eighty-three painting were put on display at the South Kensington Museum, before they would be sold seven years later by her grandson for the sum of £121,550. The payment of this amount was made by the London art dealer Asher Wertheimer.

Works
Following is a partial listing of the paintings that were in The Hope Collection of Pictures of the Dutch and Flemish Schools.(Those with a  preceding their title were on display at the 1857 Manchester Art Treasures exhibition.)

References

Sources

Notes

Former private collections
Hope family